Eduard Bohlen was a ship that was wrecked on the Skeleton Coast of German Southwest Africa (now Namibia) on 5 September 1909 in a thick fog. The wreck currently lies in the sand  from the shoreline.

Service

In September 1909, it ran aground in thick fog and was wrecked at Conception Bay while on a voyage from Swakopmund to Table Bay.

Wreck

In popular culture
A 1990s documentary on another vessel lost on the same beach miles away, the MV Dunedin Star, also featured the Bohlen. The wreck was featured in the 2011 television series Wonders of the Universe. It was later featured in the 2016 Amazon Video series The Grand Tour. It features as the finish point for 2020 sport relief The Heat Is On.

References

External links

1890 ships
Maritime incidents in 1909
Shipwrecks of Namibia